Holger Bauroth (born 7 February 1965) is an East German-German cross-country skier who competed from 1986 to 1995. He finished fifth in the 50 km event at the 1988 Winter Olympics in Calgary.

Bauroth finished ninth in the 15 km event at the 1989 FIS Nordic World Ski Championships in Lahti. His best World Cup finish was second three times at various distances (twice in 1988, once in 1989).

Cross-country skiing results
All results are sourced from the International Ski Federation (FIS).

Olympic Games

World Championships

World Cup

Season standings

Individual podiums
4 podiums

References

External links

Olympic 4 x 10 km relay results: 1936-2002 

1965 births
Cross-country skiers at the 1988 Winter Olympics
Cross-country skiers at the 1992 Winter Olympics
German male cross-country skiers
Living people
Olympic cross-country skiers of East Germany
Olympic cross-country skiers of Germany
People from Suhl
Sportspeople from Thuringia